Alexander Creek, also known as Taguntna Creek, is a   long stream from Alexander Lake which merges with the big Susitna River near the village of Alexander Creek, Alaska also known as Alexander, Alaska, an Alaska Native and Alaska Bush community, in Matanuska-Susitna Borough, Alaska.

Watershed 
Alexander Creek is considered a (Wild; and Scenic, Recreation, Fish, Wildlife, and Cultural) river by the National Park Service

History 
Alexander Creek was reported in 1898 by Eldridge (1900, p. 10), United States Geological Survey. Alexander Creek was also known as Taguntna Creek,
and Tuqentnu ("Clearwater Creek")

Economy 
Popular river for anglers, particularly for king salmon and coho salmon. The upper reaches are scenic, with views of the Alaska Range. Class I water encourages high use by beginning floaters. The lower reaches contain native archaeological sites, historic roadhouses, and the Iditarod Trail.

Lists

Tributaries 

From mouth going upstream to the source:

Lower Sucker Creek , elevation: 
Sucker Lake , elevation: 

Upper Sucker Creek , elevation: 
Lake 

Alexander Lake

See also 
List of rivers of Alaska

References

General references 

Rivers of Matanuska-Susitna Borough, Alaska
Rivers of Alaska